The Bridge in Newport Borough is a historic bridge located at Newport in Perry County, Pennsylvania. It is an  multi-span stone arch bridge.  It was built in 1929 and crosses Little Buffalo Creek.

It was listed on the National Register of Historic Places in 1988.

References 

Road bridges on the National Register of Historic Places in Pennsylvania
Bridges completed in 1929
Bridges in Perry County, Pennsylvania
National Register of Historic Places in Perry County, Pennsylvania
Stone arch bridges in the United States